is a monorail station on the Chiba Urban Monorail in Chūō-ku in the city of Chiba, Chiba Prefecture, Japan. It is located 0.7 kilometers from the terminus of the line at Chiba Station.

Lines
 Chiba Urban Monorail Line 1

Station layout
Shiyakusho-mae Station is an elevated station with two opposed side platforms serving two tracks.

Platforms

History
Shiyakusho-mae Station opened on August 1, 1995.

See also
 List of railway stations in Japan

External links

Chiba Urban Monorail website 

Railway stations in Japan opened in 1995
Railway stations in Chiba Prefecture